Canterburied Sounds is a series of four CDs of archival Canterbury scene recordings compiled from the private collection of Brian Hopper.  The set includes some of the earliest-known recordings of Caravan, Soft Machine, Robert Wyatt, and Wilde Flowers.

Editions
The first edition in 1998 was released as four separate CDs.  In 2013 Voiceprint reissued the four discs in a single boxed set.

Cover
The cover watercolor painting of Canterbury Cathedral is by Leslie Hopper, father of Brian and Hugh Hopper.  Other watercolors by Leslie Hopper have been featured on Hugh Hopper’s official website.  In 1978 Hugh and his father published a book of his church paintings.

Tracks
The notes are excerpted from extensive comments on each track by Brian Hopper.

Volume 1: Canterburied Sounds

Volume 2: All Roads Lead Back to Canterbury

Volume 3: A Kinship of Sounds

Volume 4: Canterbury Pre-Soft, Pre-Wild

References

External links
Hulloder.nl
Discogs.com
Allmusic.com
Floatingworldrecords.co.uk
Noisette.nl
Disco-robertwyatt.com

1998 compilation albums
Canterbury scene compilation albums